Shaykh Abul Qasim Gurgani (990/380–1058/450 AH) (Persian:ابو القاسم گرگانی)   was an Iranian Sufi of Kubruwia Sufi tariqah as well as other Sufi orders. Shaykh Gurgani authored a book titled "Fusūl al-Tarīqah wa Fusūl al-Haqīqah". His grave is located in a small village, three kilometers south of Torbat Ḥeydarīyeh in Iran.

Early life 
He was born in Gorgan in 380 AH. He received the spiritual Knowledge of Sufism from the master of Abu Usman Almaghribi.

Companions 
His spiritual successor was Abubakr Nisaj and some other disciples were.
 Abu Ali al-Farmadi
 Khwaja Ali Hallaj
 Abubakr Abdullah Tusi

References 

Iranian Sufis
People from Gorgan
380 births
450 deaths